La Grande  is a city in Union County, Oregon, United States. Originally named "Brownsville," it was forced to change its name because that name was being used for a city in Linn County. Located in the Grande Ronde Valley, the city's name comes from an early French settler, Charles Dause, who often used the phrase "La Grande" to describe the area's beauty. The population was 13,082 at the 2010 census. It is the county seat of Union County. La Grande lies east of the Blue Mountains and southeast of Pendleton.

History

Early settlement
The Grande Ronde Valley had long been a waypoint along the Oregon Trail. The first permanent settler in the La Grande area was Benjamin Brown in 1861.  Not long after, the Leasey family and about twenty others settled there.  The settlement was originally named after Ben Brown as Brown's Fort, Brown's Town, or Brownsville. There was already a Brownsville in Linn County, so when the post office was established in 1863, a more distinctive name was needed. It was decided to use "La Grande", a phrase used by a Frenchman, Charles Dause, to describe the area's scenic splendor.  Before the post office was established, William Currey charged 50 cents a letter to carry the mail on horseback to and from the nearest post office, in Walla Walla, Washington.  La Grande was incorporated as a city in 1865, and platted in 1868.

Growth
La Grande grew rapidly during the late 1860s and early 1870s, partially because of the region's many gold mines and the valley's agricultural capabilities. The early business establishments centered on C Avenue between present day Fourth Street and the hillside on the west end.

In 1884, the railroad came to the flat slightly east of "Old Town".  This helped the town to grow and gave rise to "New Town", centered on Adams Avenue and built parallel to the railroad tracks.

By 1900, La Grande's population was 2992, representing half of the population of Baker City.

La Grande's Eastern Oregon University, formerly known as Eastern Oregon State College, began in 1929 as Eastern Oregon Normal School, a teachers college.

Sugar factory
La Grande had a factory for processing sugar beets into raw sugar. The sugar beets came from the nearby Mormon town of Nibley, Oregon, and both were owned by the Oregon Sugar Company. R. Doerstling, the superintendent of the factory in 1899, reported seeing a Native American teepee built out of used cloth filters from the factory.

Geography
The town is a major hub in the valley. Mount Emily is a Grande Ronde Valley landmark towering over the city of La Grande to the north. It often features prominently on logos of local organizations and is matched on the other side of the valley by a similar landmark, Mount Harris.

Climate
Under the Köppen climate classification system, La Grande features a warm-summer Mediterranean climate (Köppen Csb), closely bordering on a hot-summer Mediterranean climate (Köppen Csa). This climate type is characterized by warm, dry summers and cold winters.

Demographics

2010 census
As of the census of 2010, there were 13,082 people, 5,395 households, and 3,073 families living in the city. The racial makeup of the city was 91.3% White, 0.8% African American, 1.4% Native American, 1.1% Asian, 1.5% Pacific Islander, 1.4% from other races, and 2.5% from two or more races. Hispanic or Latino of any race were 4.6% of the population.

There were 5,395 households, of which 28.4% had children under the age of 18 living with them, 40.7% were married couples living together, 11.7% had a female householder with no husband present, 4.6% had a male householder with no wife present, and 43.0% were non-families. 32.8% of all households were made up of individuals, and 11.6% had someone living alone who was 65 years of age or older. The average household size was 2.30 and the average family size was 2.93.

The median age in the city was 32.8 years. 22.4% of residents were under the age of 18; 16% were between the ages of 18 and 24; 23.6% were from 25 to 44; 23.3% were from 45 to 64; and 14.8% were 65 years of age or older. The gender makeup of the city was 48.1% male and 51.9% female.

2000 census
As of the census of 2000, there were 12,327 people, 5,124 households, and 2,982 families living in the city. The population density was 2,833.5 people per square mile (1,094.1/km2). There were 5,483 housing units at an average density of 1,260.3 per square mile (486.7/km2). The racial makeup of the city was 92.92% White, 1.26% Asian, 0.90% Pacific Islander, 0.78% Native American, 0.68% African American, 1.40% from other races, and 2.07% from two or more races. Hispanic or Latino of any race were 2.77% of the population.

There were 5,124 households, out of which 28.0% had children under the age of 18 living with them, 45.1% were married couples living together, 9.6% had a female householder with no husband present, and 41.8% were non-families. 32.2% of all households were made up of individuals, and 12.6% had someone living alone who was 65 years of age or older. The average household size was 2.32 and the average family size was 2.93.

In the city, the population was spread out, with 23.6% under the age of 18, 16.5% from 18 to 24, 23.9% from 25 to 44, 21.4% from 45 to 64, and 14.6% who were 65 years of age or older. The median age was 34 years. For every 100 females, there were 90.3 males. For every 100 females age 18 and over, there were 88.0 males.

The median income for a household in the city was $31,576, and the median income for a family was $40,508. Males had a median income of $32,746 versus $21,930 for females. The per capita income for the city was $16,550. About 8.3% of families and 15.2% of the population were below the poverty line, including 10.0% of those under age 18 and 9.0% of those age 65 or over.

Museums and other points of interest

Commercial district
See also Wikimedia Commons Photographs from the La Grande Commercial Historic District

La Grande includes a historic commercial district listed on the National Register of Historic Places in September 2001.  The  district is bounded by the following:
on the northeast, by Oregon Railroad and Navigation Company/Union Pacific Railroad tracks along Jefferson Avenue;
on the south, by Spring Avenue, Greenwood Street and Cove Avenue;
on the southwest by Washington Avenue; and
on the west by Fourth Street.

Education
The city is served by the La Grande School District, which includes Central Elementary School, Island City Elementary, Greenwood Elementary School, La Grande Middle School, and La Grande High School. La Grande is the home of Eastern Oregon University.

Media
The Observer is the local daily newspaper.  Local radio stations include
KLBM AM 1450 and the following stations on the FM dial:
KUBQ FM 98.7,
KWRL FM 102.3,
KTVR FM 90.3
KCMB FM 104.7, and
KRJT FM 105.9.

La Grande is considered part of the Portland television market despite its distance from the western part of the state. Spanish language
Univision affiliate KUNP (channel 16) is licensed to La Grande as a sister station to Portland ABC affiliate KATU (channel 2), though is effectively considered to be a Portland station because its former owner employed a strategy of using fringe stations to serve an entire market through cable and satellite distribution with little to no local presence (KUNP's parent company maintains a translator station serving Portland proper).

Transportation

Highways

 Interstate 84 is the main freeway past La Grande. It links La Grande with other nearby cities in the area (Pendleton, Baker City), as well as other regionally important cities, including Ontario, Umatilla, Portland, Boise, Idaho, and Spokane and Tri-Cities, and Seattle in Washington.
 U.S. Route 30 serves as La Grande's main street under the name of Adams Avenue.
 Oregon Route 82 begins in La Grande at its intersection with Adams Avenue. The La Grande area's portion of OR 82 is Island Avenue, commonly known as the Island City Strip because it serves as the main road to La Grande's northern suburb of Island City. OR 82 ends in Wallowa County's town of Joseph, Oregon.
 Oregon Route 237 begins in nearby Island City and is the main route to the nearby town of Cove. It ends in North Powder and joins Interstate 84 there.
 Oregon Route 203 starts southeast of La Grande, near the intersection of Interstate 84 and U.S. Route 30. It is the main route to the town of Union. It ends a few miles north of Baker City. The Highway travels through Pyles Canyon and is an alternate route to Ladd Canyon, the main route on I-84 out of the Grande Ronde Valley to the south.

Rail
La Grande is a crew change point on the Huntington and La Grande subdivisions of the Union Pacific Railroad, originally constructed through the area in 1884 by the Oregon Railway and Navigation Company.  Between 1977 and 1997, the city had a station along the former route of Amtrak's Pioneer between Chicago, Salt Lake City, Portland and Seattle. The 1930-built station still exists, and is used by Union Pacific as offices. La Grande is also the junction of the Idaho Northern and Pacific Railroad's  short line to Elgin.

Air
La Grande/Union County Airport

Notable people
 Ray Baum, Oregon state legislator, lawyer
 Jadin Bell, whose suicide helped spark national awareness of bullying
 Joe Bell, anti-bullying and suicide awareness activist, and father of Jadin Bell
 Bucky Buckwalter, former National Basketball Association coach and executive
 John F. Nugent, United States  Senator from Idaho
 William De Los Santos, poet, screenwriter and film director
 Ron Gilbert, a computer game designer, best known for his work on several LucasArts adventure games
 Steve House, professional climber and mountain guide
 Jack Ward Thomas, senior research wildlife biologist, 13th Chief of the U.S. Forest Service
 Agnes Vernon, silent film actress
 Paul Wheaton, permaculture theorist, software engineer

References

External links

City of La Grande (official website)
La Grande listing in the Oregon Blue Book

Union County Chamber of Commerce

 
Cities in Oregon
County seats in Oregon
Cities in Union County, Oregon
Populated places established in 1865
Micropolitan areas of Oregon
1865 establishments in Oregon